Ptenothrix is a genus of globular springtails in the family Dicyrtomidae. There are about 11 described species in Ptenothrix.

Species
These 11 species belong to the genus Ptenothrix:
 Ptenothrix atra (Linnaeus, C, 1758) Börner, 1906
 Ptenothrix beta (Christiansen, K & Bellinger, P, 1981) Christiansen, K & Bellinger, P, 1998
 Ptenothrix castanea Snider, RJ, 1985
 Ptenothrix curvilineata Wray, 1949
 Ptenothrix flavescens (Axelson, 1905)
 Ptenothrix macomba Wray, 1967
 Ptenothrix maculosa (Schott, 1891)
 Ptenothrix marmorata (Packard, 1873) Mills, HB, 1934
 Ptenothrix palmata (Folsom, JW, 1902) Stach, J, 1957
 Ptenothrix renateae Snider, RJ, 1985
 Ptenothrix unicolor

References

Further reading

 
 
 

Springtail genera